Alloway railway station was a railway station serving the village of Alloway, South Ayrshire, Scotland. The station was part of the Maidens and Dunure Light Railway.

History
The station opened on 17 May 1906. It closed on 1 December 1930 and reopened on 4 July 1932 when a holiday camp was opened in the Heads of Ayr, however it closed again on 31 May 1933.

Despite being closed the station site was host to two LMS caravans from 1933 to 1939.

Although the line through the station reopened again in the summer of 1947 to coincide with the opening of a new Heads of Ayr station serving the newly opened Butlins, this only served the camp and Alloway station did not reopen. The line through the station closed for the final time on 14 September 1968.

References

Notes

Sources
 
 
 Station on navigable O.S. map
Love, Dane (2003). Ayr Past & Present, Sutton Publishing Ltd, Stroud. .
 
 Article in British Railway Journal No 8 Summer 1985 Wild Swan Publications

Further reading
 David McConnell and Stuart Rankin Rails to Turnberry and Heads of Ayr. The Oakwood Press. .

Disused railway stations in South Ayrshire
Railway stations in Great Britain opened in 1906
Railway stations in Great Britain closed in 1930
Railway stations in Great Britain opened in 1932
Railway stations in Great Britain closed in 1933
Former Glasgow and South Western Railway stations
Railway stations in Ayr